For You Alone is a 1945 British World War II romance melodrama, one of only two films directed by cinematographer Geoffrey Faithfull, starring Lesley Brook, Dinah Sheridan and Jimmy Hanley.  The film was made by a smaller studio, Butcher's Films – more known for turning out quickly and cheaply shot B-movies – and had a lack of (at the time) star names, but appears to have been a relatively sophisticated and well-financed production.  On its release, three weeks after V-E Day, the film became a huge popular success, seeming to catch the mood of a nation just beginning to emerge from war.

For You Alone is often categorised as a musical, and indeed was promoted as such, but this is somewhat misleading;  in crucial concert scenes the film features singers Heddle Nash and Helen Hill with accompaniment from the London Symphony Orchestra; however, none of the film's actors sing.

Plot
John Bradshaw (Robert Griffith), a young naval officer, attends a lunchtime concert at Westminster Central Hall where he meets Reverend Peter Britton (G.H. Mulcaster) and his daughter Katherine (Brook).  After the concert the three share a taxi, and after seeing her father off on the train to a conference Katherine agrees to have tea with John.  They enjoy each other's company and later go to see a film, followed by dinner and a stroll along the Thames Embankment.  John impulsively tells Katherine that he has fallen in love with her, but she reminds him that they hardly know one another, and since her brother's death in the Far East she has to devote herself to her father.

The couple finally part, agreeing to meet again the following day.  However Katherine receives a telegram at her hotel, stating that her brother Dennis (Hanley) has turned up alive and will be arriving home the next day.  She returns home early the next morning, leaving a note of explanation for John.  Unfortunately John forgets the name of Katherine's hotel, so does not receive the note and is distraught when she fails to turn up for their rendezvous.  Meanwhile, back at home, Katherine finds that Dennis is accompanied by Max Borrow (Manning Whiley), an old admirer who still wants to marry her.  He has sustained serious eye injuries while saving Dennis' life, and Katherine as a result feels she must accept him.  Dennis himself immediately rekindles his courtship with local schoolteacher Stella White (Sheridan).

John remembers that Katherine's father is due to return to London from the conference and waits at the station until he arrives.  They learn from the hotel why Katherine departed so hurriedly, and Rev. Britton invites John back to their village where he knows the local squire is looking for help in cataloguing his library.  John is deeply upset to discover Katherine is engaged, and also  resentful towards Dennis and Stella for their obvious happiness together.  Katherine finally admits to John the reason she and Max are engaged, and John agrees to not pursue matters unless Max can be cured.

Max goes off for a medical examination, and John is recalled to his ship.  As he is about to leave, a fire breaks out in a storage shed where children are playing.  Max, having been told that his sight is safe, arrives back while the drama is in progress, and John is injured as he rescues the children.  Katherine's reaction leaves Max in no doubt as to her feelings.  That evening he tells her that he knows the situation, and will release her from her obligation to him so that she may marry John.

Cast

  Lesley Brook as Katherine Britton
  Dinah Sheridan as Stella White
  Jimmy Hanley as Dennis Britton
  Robert Griffiths as John Bradshaw
  G. H. Mulcaster as Rev. Peter Britton
  Hay Petrie as Sir Henry Markham
  Olive Walter as Lady Markham

  Manning Whiley as Max Borrow
  Irene Handl as Miss Trotter
  George Merritt as P.C. Blundell
  Muriel George as Mrs. Johns
  Aubrey Mallalieu as Eye Specialist
  Heddle Nash as himself
  Helen Hill as herself

Later history
For You Alone proved to be a major box-office hit on its original release, and again when re-released to cinemas in 1948 and 1949.  It is known that prints of the film were available to hire from a now-defunct film rental company until at least the late 1960s, but then the trail goes cold.  The British Film Institute has been unable to locate a print for inclusion in the BFI National Archive and currently classes the film as "missing, believed lost", with only a selection of stills and publicity material known to survive.  Due to the film's great box-office appeal in the 1940s and the way in which it appears to have struck a chord with the British cinemagoing public at the time, it is included on the BFI's "75 Most Wanted" list of missing British feature films.

On 31 July 2019, a 16mm safety print was uncovered by Ray Langstone at the UCLA Film and Television Archive using their online searchable database, being held as part of the Mel Torme Collection.

See also
List of rediscovered films

References

External links
 BFI 75 Most Wanted entry, with extensive notes
 
 

1945 films
1945 romantic drama films
British black-and-white films
World War II films made in wartime
Melodrama films
British romantic drama films
1940s rediscovered films
Rediscovered British films
1940s English-language films
1940s British films